The term disengagement can refer to:

 Apathy
 Disengagement theory in gerontology
 Moral disengagement
 Religious disengagement
 Social disengagement
Disengagement (military)
Disengagement (engineering)
Disengagement (politics)
Israeli disengagement plan (disambiguation)
Israeli disengagement from Gaza
Superpower disengagement
Disengagement (film) by director Amos Gitai
"Disengagement", a song by Sentenced from the album Shadows of the Past

See also

 Engagement (disambiguation)
 Engage (disambiguation)
 Engaged (disambiguation)
 Disengage (disambiguation)